Pyotr Nikolayevich Pospelov (– 22 April 1979) was a high-ranked functionary of the Communist Party of the Soviet Union ("Old Bolshevik", since 1916), propagandist, academician of the USSR Academy of Sciences (1953), chief editor of Pravda newspaper, and director of the Institute of Marxism-Leninism. He was known as a staunch Stalinist who quickly became a supporter of Nikita Khrushchev.

Life and career
Pospelov was born at Konakovo in 1898. He joined the Bolsheviks as a student, in 1916. In 1917, he was secretary of the Tver textile workers' union. In 1918–19, he worked for the Bolshevik underground in Chelyabinsk, which was then controlled by the White Army. He was based in Tver again, in 1920, until 1924, when he was transferred to the Agitprop department of the Central Committee. The party machine was then already controlled by Joseph Stalin, whom Pospelov loyally supported until Stalin's death in 1953. In 1926–30, he studied at the Communist Academy in Moscow, and then in the Economics Department of the Institute of Red Professors in 1930. In 1930–39, he was a member of the Central Control Commission and its successor, the Party Control Commission.

Pospelov was one of the principal authors of The History of the Communist Party of the Soviet Union (Bolsheviks): Short Course, which served as a basic text on party history in the Stalinist period.

Early in the Great Purge, on 13 March 1937, just after two of Lenin's former closest comrades, Nikolai Bukharin and Alexei Rykov had been arrested, Pravda gave prominence to an article signed by Pospelov, headed 'The Struggle of Bukharin and Rykov against Lenin and the party', accusing them of criminal links with Leon Trotsky

In 1937–40, he was appointed deputy head of Agitprop, which was headed by Andrei Zhdanov. He was a member of the Central Committee, 1939–1971. In September 1940, he was appointed chief editor of Pravda, but was sacked in August 1949, and replaced by Mikhail Suslov, at a time when dozens of officials who had been linked to Zhdanov were losing their jobs in a purge carried out by Zhdanov's former rival, Georgy Malenkov. He held the lesser post of Director of the Marx-Engels-Lenin-Stalin Institute, in 1949–52. Early in 1953, he was reinstated as deputy chief editor of Pravda.

On 6 March 1953, just after the death of Stalin, Pospelov was appointed a Secretary of the Central Committee. In the power struggles of the early 1950s, he backed Nikita Khrushchev against Malenkov.

Pospelov was reputedly so upset when Stalin died that he was started sobbing, until the police chief, Lavrentiy Beria shook him, exclaiming "What's the matter with you? Cut it out!". Yet he played a prominent role in dismantling Stalin's reputation. Speaking to the USSR Academy of Sciences on 19 October 1953, Pospelov was one of the first to publicly attack the 'Cult of the Personality'.

Khrushchev revealed in his memoirs that in 1954 Pospelov was put in charge of what became known as the "Pospelov commission" which investigated cases of loyal party officials who had been the mass repressions in the Soviet Union, and that he wrote the speech, On the Personality Cult and its Consequences. which Khrushchev delivered during a closed session of the 20th Party Congress, in 1956. Khrushchev claimed that he had even proposed that Pospelov should deliver it, but was talked into delivering it himself. During the 21st Party Congress, in February 1959, Pospelov delivered a speech in which he denounced Malenkov and his allies as a "wretched group of bankrupts, splitters and fractionists."

Pospelov lost his position as a secretary of the Central Committee in May 1960, at a time when hardliners such as Suslov had forced Khrushchev to take a harder line against the west, in the wake of the shooting down of the U2 pilot, Gary Powers.  In 1961–67, Pospelov returned to his former role as Director of the Marx-Engels-Lenin Institute.

Despite his part in the process of de-Stalinisation, in a 1969 article in the Kommunist, Pospelov praised Stalin as bulwark of party unity in the face of the "anti-Leninist" challenge of Trotskyism, writing that

Pospelov died in Moscow in 1979 and was buried at the Novodevichy Cemetery.

Awards
6 Orders of Lenin
Order of the October Revolution
Order of the Patriotic War of 2nd degree
Order of Friendship of Peoples
Hero of Socialist Labor (1958)
Stalin Prize (1943)

References

1898 births
1979 deaths
People from Konakovsky District
People from Korchevskoy Uyezd
Old Bolsheviks
Institute of Red Professors alumni
Politburo of the Central Committee of the Communist Party of the Soviet Union candidate members
Second convocation members of the Soviet of the Union
Third convocation members of the Soviet of the Union
Fourth convocation members of the Soviet of Nationalities
Fifth convocation members of the Soviet of Nationalities
Sixth convocation members of the Soviet of Nationalities
Mass media in the Soviet Union
20th-century Russian writers
Soviet newspaper editors
Soviet journalists
Full Members of the USSR Academy of Sciences
Heroes of Socialist Labour
Stalin Prize winners
Recipients of the Order of Lenin
Recipients of the Order of Friendship of Peoples
Burials at Novodevichy Cemetery
Pravda people